Łapszanka , is a village in the administrative district of Gmina Łapsze Niżne, within Nowy Targ County, Lesser Poland Voivodeship, in southern Poland, close to the border with Slovakia.

The village has a population of 400.

It is one of the 14 villages in the Polish part of the historical region of Spiš (Polish: Spisz).

References

Villages in Nowy Targ County
Spiš
Kraków Voivodeship (1919–1939)